The Premier Soccer League (PSL) is the professional soccer leagues-and-cups administrator in South Africa based in Johannesburg and founded in 1996 following an agreement between the National Soccer League and the remnants of the National Professional Soccer League (NPSL).

Affiliated to the South African Football Association (SAFA), the PSL organizes the country's top two professional divisions in the DStv Premiership and the Motsepe Foundation Championship and knockout cup competitions in the Nedbank Cup and the MTN 8. Teams that are relegated from the National First Division compete in the SAFA Second Division. They also organize a Youth League or Reserve League DStv Diski Challenge.

Organization 

The Premier Soccer League sell the naming rights of their competitions to a title sponsor.

They had previously organized Charity Cup, a one-day, four team, season-opening cup competition, which ran from 1986 to 2010. The Baymed Cup was open to First Division sides, but the competition was terminated after a single edition in 2006.

League licenses 

Licenses to participate in the Premier Soccer League can be bought and sold on the free market. In August 2002, the PSL bought two Premier Division licences from the owners of Ria Stars F.C. and Free State Stars F.C., the PSL dissolved the license to ease fixture congestion and reduce their own costs by R 400, 000 per month as each top-tier club received R 200, 000 on a monthly basis from the PSL. The two clubs were purchased for R 8 million. The two clubs had differing fates, Ria Stars never appeared again whilst Free State Stars bought the league license from Maholosiane F.C., a team participating in the National First Division in the 2002–03 season and earned promotion to the top tier in the 2003–04 season.

Structure 
The NSL is the only special member of the South African Football Association. The NSL has 32 members; the 16 clubs from the Premier Division and 16 clubs from the First division who together form the Board of governors. The Board of governors is the supreme body and its functions are stated in Article 13 of the NSL constitution. The Board of governors elects the chairman and the executive committee, it is empowered to delegate management and operational functions to the executive committee. The executive committee consists of 8 elected members and the chief executive officer. The Executive is appointed for a period of four years at the quadrennial general meeting. The Executive delegates some of its operational functions to the CEO.

References

External links

 
Sports leagues established in 1996
1996 establishments in South Africa
Professional sports leagues in South Africa